Stefano Travaglia was the defending champion but chose not to defend his title.

Pablo Andújar won the title after defeating Benoît Paire 4–6, 7–6(8–6), 6–4 in the final.

Seeds
All seeds receive a bye into the second round.

Draw

Finals

Top half

Section 1

Section 2

Bottom half

Section 3

Section 4

References

External links
Main draw
Qualifying draw

Casino Admiral Trophy - Singles